Rangit Dam (Hindi: रन्गीत् बाँध Bāndh), which  forms the headworks of the Rangit Hydroelectric Power Project Stage III, is a run-of-the-river hydroelectric power project on the Ranjit River, a major tributary of the Teesta River in the South Sikkim district of  the Northeastern Indian state of Sikkim. The project's construction was completed in 1999. The project is fully functional since 2000. The project was built at a cost of Rs 4922.6 million (Rs 492.26 crores) (at US$1 = Rs 45, this is US$109.39 million). The average annual power generation from the 60 MW (3x20 MW) project is 340 GWh with firm power of 39 MW.

Topography

The Ranjit River on which the Rangit Dam is located, is a major right bank tributary of the Teesta River in Sikkim. A number of perennial streams originate in glacial fields of the river basin; important snow-fed rivers which constitute the Rangit basin above the dam site are the Rathong Chu, Rimbi Chu, Prek Chu, Ralli Chu, Rongdon Chu and Kayam Chu. The drainage pattern is sub-dendentric.

The dam is located downstream of the confluence of Rathong Chu and Rangit Rivers near the Legship town and the powerhouse of the project is located near Sagbari village.

Hydrology
The annual inflow in the river at the location of the dam has been estimated as 696,000 cubic metres. The maximum flood discharge has been adopted as /s while the design flood discharge adopted for the spillway of the dam is /sec. The dependable discharge adopted for diversion from the reservoir for power generation is 17/s (without considering contribution from the upstream Stage II project, which is yet to be implemented).

Climate
The climate of the Rangit River basin is cold and humid. The climatic seasons of the basin represented in the project area are: spring season-late February, summer season-March, premonsoon showers-April and May; monsoon season May to September, sometimes extending to October.  The snow season,  at higher elevations of the catchment falls between December and February. Winters are very cold with mist and fog lasting from November to February.

Geology
Precambrian formations of the Daling series of quartzites and phyllites dominate the area. This rock type is overlain by crystalline Darjeeling Gneiss comprising gneisses and granitoides. Recent alluvium of sandy loam, silty loam and clayey material of varying thickness overlay the rock formations. The banks of the Rangit River depict silty clay material with large rock blocks. Many land slides are observed in the catchment, which add to the siltation problems of the reservoir.

Project features

The reservoir created behind the dam has a storage capacity of 1,175,000 cubic metres. The storage created is utilized for hydropower generation at a surface Powerhouse located on the left bank of the Rangit River. The diversion of flow from the reservoir to the surface Powerhouse is effected through an Intake leading to a concrete lined Head Race Tunnel (HRT) of  diameter (Horse shoe shaped and concrete lined) of  length, a Surge Shaft ( diameter and of  depth at the end of the HRT with control arrangement followed by one main penstock pipe (of  diameter and length of ) trifurcating into three lines of  diameter each (with a total length of all three lines is ) to connect to the three Francis Turbine Generating Units of 20 MW capacity each, through the MIVs. The tailwaters from the turbines are led back into the river through a combined short tailrace channel. The firm power generation is of the order of 39 MW corresponding to annual energy generation of 340 GWh (in a 90% dependable year). Since it is owned by coastal projects ltd, the power generated is shared and Sikkim gets a share of 13.33%.

The project was funded by the Government of India and built by its parastatal organization namely, the National Hydroelectric Power Corporation (NHPC). The construction of the project was completed in December 1999 and operation started in January 2000. Operation and maintenance of the project is also with the NHPC.

This power project was the third stage of the five-stage cascade development conceived on the main stem of the Rangit River, and was the first to be built in the series of Rangit Stage I to IV initially conceived by the Central Water Commission. Three other projects on the Rangit River planned and under development are the Rangit Stage II (60 MW capacity), Rangit Stage IV (3×40 MW = 120 MW capacity) and Jorethong HEP (96 MW); the last two projects are now under construction.

Environmental aspects

In river valley reservoir projects, the gravity of the siltation problem induced due to catchment degradation is serious and needs to be suitably addressed. For this purpose, the Ministry of Environment and Forests, Government of India have made it obligatory for the project authorities to implement physical engineering and biological measures in the catchment area of the project to be taken up pari passu (concurrently) with the implementation of the Hydropower project. This activity involves several works defined under the 'Catchment Area Treatment' (CAT) plan.

For evolving the CAT plan, the status of the reservoir catchment was analysed. The reservoir catchment consists of five types of forests namely, the East Himalayan Sub-Tropical wet hill forests (elevation range of ), East Himalayan wet temperate forests (elevation range of ), Oak and Rhododendron forests (elevated above ), mixed coniferous forests (in elevation range of ) and alpine scrubs/pastures (above ). There are 35 reserve forests in the catchment, out of which 29 are in West Sikkim district and six (6) are in South Sikkim district. The entire catchment area was analysed in detail to assess the degraded areas to be treated under the CAT plan to reduce siltation problems. An area of ) was identified for implementing engineering and biological treatment measures. These measures were implemented, starting with 1995–96, by the Forest Department of the Government of Sikkim involving engineering treatment measures (included agricultural land, forest land and water land) and biological treatment measures. 15 nurseries were established covering an area of ) to provide saplings/seedlings for plantation in the sub-watersheds of the catchment identified for treatment.

Recreation
The reservoir created by the Rangit dam has been developed into a recreational water park named 'Rangit Water World'. It is a popular venue for picnics, fishing, boating and rafting. The recreational centre was developed due to the initiative of the local people of Legship town.

See also

 Jorethang Loop Hydroelectric project

Notes

External links

Coordinates of Rangit Dam

Rivers of Sikkim
Dams in Sikkim
Hydroelectric power stations in Sikkim
Dams in the Brahmaputra River Basin
Dams completed in 1999
Rivers of India
1999 establishments in Sikkim
20th-century architecture in India